Sand composites, most commonly sand reinforced polyester composites (SPCs), involve a building material with sand acting as reinforcement in the composite. Pioneers in using sand reinforced composites include German business men Gerhard Dust and Gunther Plötner, who made sand reinforced composite bricks with polyester resin and hardener to provide emergency relief housing for those affected by the 2010 earthquake in Haiti. Sand was used in the composites because of its abundance and ease in obtaining.

Composition 
The composition of sand is highly variable depending on the origin of the sand. The most common material found in non-tropical, coastal, and inland sand is silica usually in the form of quartz – which is considerably hard and one of the most common minerals resistant to weathering.

Preparation 

 Drying sand
 Mixing with alternate material(s)
 Adding a hardener to the mixture (such as methyl ethyl ketone peroxide)
 Pouring mixture into mold and drying
 Releasing from mold and smoothing

Properties 

 SPCs decrease water absorption because of the hydrophobic nature of sand.
 The compression strength of SPCs is typically lower than non-sand reinforced composites.
 Flexural strength of SPCs decreases with an increasing weight percent of sand. The composite becomes increasingly brittle as the weight percent of sand increases.
 A greater weight percent of sand increases the composite's hardness (Vickers hardness test) – sand has reinforcing capabilities.
 Thermal conductivity decreases with a greater weight percent of sand. Sand has insulating properties.

References 

Composite materials